Cornel Popa (19 March 1935 – 4 November 1999) was a Romanian football player who played as a right defender.

Club career
Cornel Popa was born on 19 March 1935 in Iași, Romania and started to play football in 1951 at junior level at local club, Victoria, before starting his senior career at Divizia B team, Locomotiva Iași. In 1955 he went to play for Dinamo Bacău where he made his Divizia A debut on 18 March 1956 in a 1–0 loss against Dinamo București. He went to play for Dinamo București where he spent a total 12 seasons at the club, winning four consecutive Divizia A titles from 1962 until 1965, in the first he played 24 matches, in the second he played 25 games, in the third he made 24 appearances and in the last he played 25 games. Popa also won three Cupa României with The Red Dogs and played 15 games in the European Cup and two in the UEFA Cup Winners' Cup. He made his last Divizia A appearance on 15 June 1969, playing for Dinamo in a 1–0 away loss against Universitatea Craiova, having a total of 262 appearances in the competition. He ended his career after spending a period in Turkey at Beşiktaş where he did not play any games. Cornel Popa died on 4 November 1999 at age 64, being ill of cancer.

International career
Cornel Popa played 27 games of which in 12 he was captain at international level for Romania, making his debut on 26 October 1958 under coach Augustin Botescu in a friendly which ended with a 2–1 away loss against Hungary. He played four games at the 1960 European Nations' Cup qualifiers, helping the team eliminate Turkey with 3–2 on aggregate, managing to qualify to the quarter-finals where they were eliminated by Czechoslovakia who advanced to the final tournament. He also played in a 3–1 victory against Spain at the 1964 European Nations' Cup qualifiers and made 6 appearances at the 1966 World Cup qualifiers. Cornel Popa played five games at the Euro 1968 qualifiers, including his last appearance which took place on 24 May 1967 in a 7–1 away loss against Switzerland.

Managerial career
Cornel Popa started coaching after 1970, working for a while at Dinamo's junior and children center, then at several teams from the Romanian lower leagues such as Unirea Alexandria, Victoria Roman and Minerul Gura Humorului without achieving any notable performances.

Honours
Dinamo București
Divizia A: 1961–62, 1962–63, 1963–64, 1964–65
Cupa României: 1958–59, 1963–64, 1967–68

Notes

References

External links

1935 births
1999 deaths
Romanian footballers
Romania international footballers
Olympic footballers of Romania
Association football defenders
Liga I players
Liga II players
FCM Bacău players
FC Dinamo București players
Beşiktaş J.K. footballers
Romanian football managers
Sportspeople from Iași